Aleksandr Davydovich Drevin (3 July 1889 – 26 February 1938) was a Latvian-Russian painter.

Biography  
Drevin was born in Cēsis, Latvia, then a part of Russian Empire. He attended art school in Riga under Vilhelms Purvītis, thus initially adapting the style of impressionist painting, and first came to Moscow in 1914. He studied under Kuzma Petrov-Vodkin. Since 1917 he worked in the Fine Arts Department of the People's Commissariat of Education. Drevin was part of the "Green Flower" association of avant-garde artists, notably with Konrāds Ubāns, Valdemārs Tone and Kārlis Johansons. Between 1920 and 1921 he was a member of the Inkhuk but later left, together with Wassily Kandinsky, Kliunkov, and Nadezhda Udaltsova, because of the Constructivist-Productivist stylistic manifesto urging the rejection of easel painting. Drevin became a professor of painting at Vkhutemas.  In 1922, he was sent to work the First Russian Art Exhibition at the Van Diemen Gallery in Berlin. He travelled across Russia, to Kazakhstan Ural, Altai and Armenia creating a series of artworks of the Soviet landscape. These trips where organised and supervised by soviet art officials

Drevin often painted a "brutal primitivism", lacking any political message or any purpose at all. His paintings have been compared to those of de Vlaminck. Drevin's paintings intentionally were empty of illusionism and decorativeness. After a period of constructivist abstract painting, his style became progressively more realistic during the 1920s.

Personal life 
He was married to Nadezhda Udaltsova; their son was Andrey Drevin, born 1921, who became a sculptor.

On 17 January 1938, during the Great Purge, as a part of the so-called "Latvian Operation", Drevin was arrested by the NKVD and executed on 26 February at the Butovo firing range near Moscow. He was posthumously rehabilitated in 1957.

References

Works cited 
A History of Painting, Alan Bird

External links

1889 births
1938 deaths
People from Cēsis
People from Kreis Wenden
Latvian painters
Soviet painters
20th-century Russian painters
Russian male painters
Academic staff of Vkhutemas
Great Purge victims from Latvia